Brevicornu is a genus of flies belonging to the family Mycetophilidae.

The genus has cosmopolitan distribution.

Species:
 Brevicornu affinis Zaitzev, 1988 
 Brevicornu amplum Blagoderov, 1992

References

Mycetophilidae